Mayo River may refer to:

 Mayo River (Dan River), in North Carolina and Virginia, United States
 Mayo River (Mexico)
 Mayo River (Peru)
 Mayo River (Argentina)
 Río Mayo, Chubut

See also
 Mayo (disambiguation)
 Río Mayo (Mexico City Metrobús), a BRT station in Mexico City